Foss-Eikeland or Foss Eikjeland is a village in the western part of the large Sandnes municipality in Rogaland county, Norway.  The village lies just south of the city of Sandnes, just north of the river Figgjoelva and the municipal border.  The neighboring village of Orstad (in Klepp municipality) lies to the south, across the river.  The Ålgård Line previously had a station at Foss-Eikeland, but the railway line is currently closed, but not abandoned.

References

Boroughs and neighbourhoods of Sandnes